Symes is a surname, and may refer to:

 Bob Symes, the stage name of inventor Robert Alexander Baron Schutzmann von Schutzmansdorff
 Brad Symes (born 1985), an Australian rules football midfielder 
 Carol Symes, American medieval historian
 Cyril Symes (born 1943), a former Canadian politician
 Michael Symes, an English footballer